Lara Tiedens is an American academic administrator. She was the president of Scripps College, a role she assumed in August 2016. She resigned in April 2021 to become president of Schwarzman Scholars, an international postgraduate award program.

References

Living people
Year of birth missing (living people)
Place of birth missing (living people)
Scripps College faculty
Heads of universities and colleges in the United States
Women heads of universities and colleges